Richard William Luther (November 11, 1919 – July 21, 2001) was an American football player and coach at Western Reserve University, known today as Case Western Reserve University.   He was later inducted into the school's varsity hall of fame on April 18, 1980. During World War II, Luther attended Midshipmen's school at the University of Notre Dame, ranking as a Lt. Senior Grade while in the United States Navy.

Playing career
In high school, Luther was a three-year star football player at John Adams High School in Cleveland, Ohio.  

For college, Luther played tackle for the Western Reserve Red Cats and was a member of the team that won the 1941 Sun Bowl.

Coaching career
In 1942, Luther began coaching as an assistant football coach for his alma mater, Western Reserve, before leaving for three years to serve in the United States Navy during World War II.  He returned to Western Reserve in 1946 and served  again an assistant coach.  During the 1947 season, head coachTom Davies was fired after five games, and Luther was named head coach, finishing the season out at a 3–1 record.  He returned to being an assistant coach for the 1948 and 1949 seasons with the hiring of former Cleveland Browns player Mike Scarry, until again he named as the head coach for the 1950 season.

Later years
Luther moved to Michigan in 1952 and began working for General Motors Institute in Flint, where he was director of management and organization development retiring in 1981.

Luther died July 21, 2001 and is buried in Flushing City Cemetery in Flushing, Michigan.

Head coaching record

References

External links
 

1919 births
2001 deaths
American football tackles
American men's basketball players
Case Western Spartans football coaches
Case Western Spartans football players
Case Western Spartans men's basketball players
United States Navy officers
United States Navy personnel of World War II
Sportspeople from Cleveland
Coaches of American football from Ohio
Players of American football from Cleveland
Basketball players from Ohio
John Adams High School (Ohio) alumni